"Snow on the Sahara" is a song by Indonesian singer Anggun from her first international studio album Snow on the Sahara. Written originally in French by Erick Benzi titled "La neige au Sahara", the song was adapted to English by Nikki Matheson. The French version was recorded for Anggun's first French album Au nom de la lune. The song was released in 1997 as her debut international single in 33 countries worldwide. It topped the charts in Italy, Spain and several countries in Asia. The French version quickly became a hit in France, peaking at number 1 on the French Airplay Chart and number 16 on the French Singles Chart. It became the most-played single in France of 1997, with a total of 7,900 radio airplays, and was certified gold for shipment of 250,000 copies. While In Italy, it sold 100,000 copies.

Background and composition

The song was written, produced and arranged by Erick Benzi and later adapted into English by songwriter Nikki Matheson. The song remains to be Anggun's signature song across the world and catapulted Anggun's fame in international music scene in 1997 and 1998. Sarah Brightman also did a cover version of this song on her The Harem World Tour: Live from Las Vegas album. The song is mainly built on synthesizers and keyboards sounds, mixed with tribal beats. It is considered to be an adult contemporary song, while some others consider it New Age or World Music.

Music video 
There are 2 versions of the music video for Snow on the Sahara. The first version was shot in Bali and features storyline about Anggun and her lover becoming the sacrifice for some ancient ritual. This version was used also for La Neige au Sahara.
The second version features Anggun in an "art room" filled with antique furniture. She was also shot in an ice-blue background, singing the lines of the song. This version receives less airplay and was only released for the US and Italian television. The length of this version is shorter than the first one, fading in 3:39. Both version received heavy rotation on MTV Asia and managed to topped the MTV Asia Hitlist chart for two weeks. Making her the first Asian artist to do so.

Track listing 
"Snow on the Sahara" (4:20)
"Selamanya" (2:21)
"La Neige au Sahara" (4:20)

Chart performance

Weekly charts

Year-end charts

Certifications

References

1997 singles
1997 songs
Anggun songs
Sarah Brightman songs
French-language songs
SNEP Top Singles number-one singles
Number-one singles in Italy
Number-one singles in Malaysia
Number-one singles in Singapore
Songs written by Erick Benzi
Epic Records singles